Ivo Alfredo Thomas Serue (born 13 April 2000), known by his stage name Khea, is an Argentine trap rapper and singer. He is a member of the Argentinian trap scene along with artists such as Cazzu and Duki.

Early years 
Ivo Alfredo Thomás Serue was born on 13 April 2000 in Virreyes, Buenos Aires. His mother was an artist and music fan, although they were not from a prestigious family, since as a child he had to deal with poverty. Ivo grew up influenced by pop music and the music his mother listened to, pointing to Canadian singer Justin Bieber and the Spanish rock and rumba band Estopa as his biggest influences.

When he reached the age of 13, he began to hang out more with his older brother and his friends which changed Ivo's musical influences from pop to rap and hip hop, mainly he became interested in freestyle battles. When Ivo was only 15 years old, he began to battle in small freestyle competitions against rappers like Midel, Frijo, Luchito, among others,  changing his stage name to Khea.

Career 

Khea is a star in the Argentine trap scene. His lyrics usually focus on romance and sex. He has collaborated with artist such as Midel, JD Pantoja, Bad Bunny, Tini, Cazzu, Duki, Tali Goya, Brytiago, OneRepublic, Blackbear, Natti Natasha, Prince Royce and others. He gained fame with the song "Loca" with Cazzu and Duki, which gained 400 million views on YouTube. He did a remix with Bad Bunny. In 2020 he collaborated with bachata guitarist / producer Lenny Santos from Aventura on the song "Ayer Me Llamó Mi Ex." In 2020 he became the most listened to artist in Argentina, reaching 10 million monthly listeners on Spotify.

Discography

Mixtape

Singles

As a lead singer

As a featured artist

Footnotes

Videography

References

External links 
Web site

Living people
2000 births
Latin trap musicians
Argentine trap musicians
Musicians from Buenos Aires